Edward William Rimkus (August 10, 1913 in Schenectady, New York – May 17, 1999 in Long Beach, California) was an American of Lithuanian descent bobsledder who competed in the late 1940s and early 1950s. He won a gold medal in the four-men event at the 1948 Winter Olympics in St. Moritz. He died in Long Beach, California.

References
Pride of Schenectady: Rimkus made his mark on world stage
Bobsleigh four-man Olympic medalists for 1924, 1932-56, and since 1964

1913 births
1999 deaths
American male bobsledders
Bobsledders at the 1948 Winter Olympics
Medalists at the 1948 Winter Olympics
Olympic gold medalists for the United States in bobsleigh